was a train station in Shimizu, Kamikawa District, Hokkaidō, Japan.

Lines
Hokkaido Railway Company
Nemuro Main Line Station K25

Adjacent stations

Railway stations in Hokkaido Prefecture
Railway stations in Japan opened in 1958